Timini Egbuson is a Nigerian actor.

Biography 
Timini was born in Bayelsa state and is the younger brother of actress Dakore Akande. He got his primary school education from Greenspring Montessori, The Afro School and St Catherine's. He attended Adebayo Mokuolu College, Lagos. He studied psychology in the University of Lagos. He graduated in the year 2011. He started his acting career in 2010, on M-net's soap opera Tinsel. At the 2020 AMVCA awards timini won the Best Actor in a drama for his role in Elevator baby.

In April 2020, he joined several actors like Jemima Osunde, Nick Mutuma and Lerato Walaza along with several actors from Kenya, South Africa, Nigeria, and the Ivory Coast to help with the campaign to stop the spread of COVID-19. It was achieved through a 60-part miniseries of MTV Shuga, which was initiated in order to raise awareness in the global fight to flatten the COVID-19 curve.

Filmography

Films 
MTV Shuga
Fifty
Manhunting with Mum
Isoken
Something Wicked
Another Time
Room 420
Ajuwaya
The Missing Piece
The Intern
Elevator Baby
The Girl Code
Breaded Life
Dwindle
Juju Stories
Superstar'Country HardPonzi

 TV shows 
 Skinny Girl in Transit Tinsel
 Fifty the series''
 The Smart Money Woman

Awards and nominations

See also
 List of Nigerian actors

References 

Living people
21st-century Nigerian male actors
People from Bayelsa State
University of Lagos alumni
Year of birth missing (living people)
Nigerian male film actors
Nigerian male television actors
Nigerian film award winners
Africa Magic Viewers' Choice Awards winners